Grog Run is a  long 1st order tributary to Buffalo Creek in Brooke County, West Virginia.

Course
Grog Run rises about 1.5 miles east of Power, West Virginia, and then flows west-northwest to join Buffalo Creek about 2 miles northwest of Bethany.

Watershed
Grog Run drains  of area, receives about 40.0 in/year of precipitation, has a wetness index of 300.19, and is about 83% forested.

See also
List of rivers of West Virginia

References

Rivers of West Virginia
Rivers of Brooke County, West Virginia